Carlos Eduardo Bacila Jatobá (born 15 September 1995) is a Brazilian footballer who plays as a midfielder for São Bento.

Career
Jatobá started his career with Figueirense, but did not play for them. He represented J. Malucelli in 2016 Campeonato Brasileiro Série D and at the end of that campaign secured a loan move to Londrina where he played a single game in 2016 Campeonato Brasileiro Série B.

In September 2017, he signed with Bulgarian First League side Dunav Ruse on a two-year deal.

On 15 June 2018, Jatobá signed for five years with Portuguese club Sporting for an undisclosed fee. He returned to Brazil on loan to Atlético Goianiense at the start of the 2019 season, and signed a further loan deal with Brasil de Pelotas in April 2019.

In January 2020, Carlos Jatobá signed for 1-year deal with CRB.

Personal life
Jatobá is the son of former Brazilian defender Carlos Roberto Jatobá.

References

External links
 
 

1995 births
Living people
Brazilian footballers
Association football midfielders
Figueirense FC players
J. Malucelli Futebol players
Londrina Esporte Clube players
FC Dunav Ruse players
Sporting CP footballers
Atlético Clube Goianiense players
Grêmio Esportivo Brasil players
Clube de Regatas Brasil players
Esporte Clube Santo André players
Campeonato Brasileiro Série B players
Campeonato Brasileiro Série D players
Campeonato Paranaense players
First Professional Football League (Bulgaria) players
Primeira Liga players
Brazilian expatriate footballers
Brazilian expatriate sportspeople in Bulgaria
Expatriate footballers in Bulgaria
Brazilian expatriate sportspeople in Portugal
Expatriate footballers in Portugal
Footballers from Curitiba